The 1982 Soviet Cup was an association football cup competition of the Soviet Union. The winner of the competition, Dinamo Kiev qualified for the continental tournament.

Competition schedule

Group stage
Games took place between February 19 – March 4, 1982.

Group I

Group II

Group III

Group IV

Group V

Group VI

Group VII

Play-off stage

Round of 16
The base game day was March 14, 1982

Quarterfinals
The base game day was March 21, 1982

Semifinals

Final

External links
 Complete calendar. helmsoccer.narod.ru
 1982 Soviet Cup. Footballfacts.ru
 1982 Soviet football season. RSSSF

Soviet Cup seasons
Cup
Soviet Cup
Soviet Cup